Celia Lipton Farris, DStJ (25 December 1923 – 11 March 2011) was a British  actress, singer and philanthropist.

Biography
Celia May Lipton was born to Sydney Lipton, a violinist and bandleader, who starred in Let's Make a Night of It, and May Johnston Parker, on 25 December 1923 in Edinburgh, Scotland.

She started her career as a singer in England and acted in movies. In 1952, she moved to New York City. She married Victor Farris, the inventor of the paper milk carton, in 1956. They moved into a house in Palm Beach, Florida, formerly owned by the Vanderbilt family. When he died in 1985, he left her US$100 million.

She was a donor and fundraiser for the Salvation Army, the American Heart Association, the National Trust for Scotland, the Great Ormond Street Children's Hospital, the American Red Cross, The Prince’s Trust, the Duke of Edinburgh Trust, the American Ballet Theatre and the Norton Museum of Art. She also supported AIDS research. She was a Dame of Grace of the Venerable Order of Saint John.

Death
Celia Lipton Farris died on 11 March 2011 in Palm Beach, Florida, aged 87. She was survived by her two adopted daughters, Marian and CeCe and her granddaughter Stephanie.

Filmography
Calling Paul Temple (1948)
This Was a Woman (1948)
The Tall Headlines (1952)
Goodyear Television Playhouse (episode The Personal Touch, 1954)
Robert Montgomery Presents (episodes The Hunchback of Notre Dame: Part 1 and The Hunchback of Notre Dame: Part 2, 1954)
B.L. Stryker (episode The Dancer's Touch, 1989)

Bibliography
My Three Lives (autobiography, 2008)

References

External links
 

1923 births
2011 deaths
Actresses from Edinburgh
People from Palm Beach, Florida
20th-century British actresses
British women singers
British film actresses
British expatriates in the United States
20th-century British philanthropists